Xixia is a town of Xinjian District, Nanchang, Jiangxi, China. , it administers Xinxi Street Community and the following 15 villages:
Xixia Village
Nanping Village
Wushi Village
Wanfu Village
Qiaonan Village
Dianqian Village
Xianli Village
Qiaoling Village
Taohua Village
Ganshe Village
Huzhao Village
Shiju Village
Baiguo Village
Chihai Village
Shenjia Village

References

Township-level divisions of Jiangxi
Nanchang